The T.J. Walker Historic District at the Sheyenne River in Fort Ransom, North Dakota, United States, is a  historic district that includes resources dating to 1880.  It was listed on the National Register of Historic Places in 1979.

The listed district includes "a complex of structures associated with pioneer miller and merchant Tyler James Walker".

References

Queen Anne architecture in North Dakota
Historic districts on the National Register of Historic Places in North Dakota
National Register of Historic Places in Ransom County, North Dakota